The men's 200 metres event at the 2003 Summer Universiade was held in Daegu, South Korea on 27–28 August.

Medalists

Results

Heats
Wind:Heat 1: -0.5 m/s, Heat 2: -0.3 m/s, Heat 3: -1.3 m/s, Heat 4: +1.9 m/s, Heat 5: +0.9 m/s, Heat 6: -0.6 m/s

Quarterfinals
Wind:Heat 1: -0.1 m/s, Heat 2: +0.1 m/s, Heat 3: +0.6 m/s, Heat 4: -0.8 m/s

Semifinals
Wind:Heat 1: +0.9 m/s, Heat 2: +0.2 m/s

Final
Wind: -0.7 m/s

References
Results

Athletics at the 2003 Summer Universiade
2003